Éric Vigeanel (born 4 August 1972) is a French Olympic eventing rider. Representing France, he competed at the 2008 Summer Olympics where she placed 11th in team and 20th in the individual eventing.

Vigeanel also participated at two European Eventing Championships (in 2007 and 2009). His biggest success came in 2007 when he won a team silver.

References

External links 
 

French male equestrians
1972 births
Olympic equestrians of France
Equestrians at the 2008 Summer Olympics
Living people
People from Saint-Mandé
Sportspeople from Val-de-Marne